Arthur and the Invisibles or Arthur and the Minimoys (French: Arthur et les Minimoys) is a 2006 English-language French fantasy adventure comedy animated/live-action film directed and co-written by French filmmaker Luc Besson. It is based on the first two books of the Arthur children's books series, Arthur and the Minimoys and Arthur and the Forbidden City, by Besson.

Arthur and the Invisibles was released theatrically in France on 29 November 2006 by EuropaCorp, followed by wide releases in a number of countries. It was re-released in France on 4 April 2007 with nineteen minutes of bonus footage. With a budget of €60 million, it was briefly the most expensive French film production, until it was surpassed by Astérix at the Olympic Games (2008).

It received positive reviews from critics in France but was received negatively in the United States, with criticism aimed at the animation, script, and humor but praises for Highmore's performance and visual aspects. The film was also a box-office success in France but under-performed in the United States. The film's success in France spawned a media franchise with two sequels, Arthur and the Revenge of Maltazard (2009) and Arthur 3: The War of the Two Worlds (2010), and a spin-off, Arthur, malédiction (2022). It also spawned multiples video games, an animated television series and theme park attractions at Futuroscope and Europa-Park.

It received the Imagina Award in the category Prix du Long-Métrage. Its soundtrack album was released on 9 January 2007.

Plot 
In 1960, protagonist 10-year-old Arthur lives with his grandmother Daisy in a quiet farm house on a dirt road, in a small rural community in Northeastern Connecticut (based on Sterling). His grandfather Archibald has recently gone missing and he sees little of his parents (who are away looking for work). Daisy entertains Arthur with stories of his grandfather's adventures in Africa, featuring the tall Bogo Matassalai and the minuscule Minimoys, of whom the latter now live in Archibald's garden, protecting a collection of rubies. Arthur becomes enamoured of a picture of Selenia, the princess of the Minimoys. When Daisy receives a two-day deadline to pay a large sum of money to a building developer named Ernest Davido, who plans to evict the two, Arthur looks for the rubies to pay off the debt and discovers various clues left by his grandfather. He is met in the garden by the Bogo Matassalai, who reduce Arthur to Minimoy size. From the Minimoys, Arthur learns that they are in danger from Maltazard, a Minimoy war hero who now rules the nearby 'Necropolis', after corruption by a weevil, by whom he has a son named Darkos.

Arthur, reflecting his legendary British namesake, draws a sacred sword from its recess and uses it to protect the Minimoys from Maltazard's soldiers; whereupon Sifrat, the ruler of the Minimoys, sends Arthur to Necropolis, with the princess Selenia and her brother Betameche. En route, they are attacked on two occasions by Maltazard's soldiers. In Necropolis, Selenia kisses Arthur, marking him as her husband and potential successor, and confronts Maltazard alone. When Maltazard learns that she has already kissed Arthur and thus can no longer give him her powers and cure his corruption, he imprisons all three, who discover a Minimoy form of Archibald. Thereafter Arthur and his grandfather escape and return to human form, with little time to spare before Maltazard's flood reaches the Minimoys. With the help of Mino, a royal advisor's long-lost son, Arthur redirects the flood to Necropolis, whereupon Maltazard abandons Necropolis and his son, and the water ejects the rubies above ground. Archibald pays Davido with one ruby; and when he tries to take them all, the Bogo Matassalai capture him and give him to the authorities (scene deleted in the U.S. edition). Arthur asks Selenia to wait for his return, and her agreement to do so while the film ends.

Cast 
 Live-action cast
 Freddie Highmore as Arthur Montgomery, a newly ten-year-old boy who journeys through the invisible world of the minimoys to find the treasure his long-lost grandfather had hidden. Highmore also voiced Arthur in animation. In the French version, Arthur is voiced by actress Barbara Kelsch who also provided the motion capture performance for the character.
 Mia Farrow as Daisy Suchot, Arthur's grandmother and Archibald's wife.
 Ron Crawford as Archibald Suchot, Arthur's grandfather and Daisy's husband. Crawford also voices Archibald in animation. The character is voiced by actor Michel Duchaussoy in the French version.
 Adam LeFevre as Ernest Davido, the Real Estate Agent. The character is voiced by actor José Garcia in the French version.
 Penny Balfour as Rose Montgomery, Arthur's mother and Daisy and Archibald's daughter. The character is voiced by actress Valérie Lemercier in the French version.
 Douglas Rand as Armand Montgomery, Arthur's Dad. The character is voiced by actor Jean-Paul Rouve in the French version.
 Jean Betote Njamba as the chief of the Matassalai. The character is voiced by rapper Doudou Masta in the French version.

 Voice cast
 Madonna as Princess Selenia, the daughter of Emperor Sifrat. The character is voiced by singer Mylène Farmer in the French version.
 Douglas Rand (Original version)/Jimmy Fallon (The Weinstein Company version) as Prince Simono Matradoy de Betameche, or simply Betameche "Beta", Selenia's younger brother. The character is voiced by radio host Cartman in the French version.
 Robert De Niro as Emperor Sifrat XVI, Betameche and Selenia's father.
 Snoop Dogg as Max, the leader of the Koolamassai, a race of beings similar to the Minimoys. The character is voiced by rapper Rohff in the French version.
 Allen Hoist as DJ Easy Low, a Koolamassai. The character is voiced by DJ Cut Killer in the French version. Hoist also voices another Koolamassai, who was dubbed over by Anthony Anderson in The Weinstein Company version
 Christian Erickson (Original version)/Jason Bateman (The Weinstein Company version) as Prince Darkos, Maltazard's vicious but dim-witted son. The character is voiced by actor Marc Lavoine in the French version.
 David Bowie as Emperor Maltazard (also known as the Evil M, Maltazard the Evil, or Malthazar the Cursed). The character is voiced by singer Alain Bashung in the French version.
 Douglas Rand (Original version)/Harvey Keitel (The Weinstein Company version) as Miro, the royal advisor.
 Barbara Weber Scaff (Original version)/Erik Per Sullivan (The Weinstein Company version) as Mino, Miro's long lost son.
 Tonio Descanvelle (Original version)/Emilio Estevez (The Weinstein Company version) as the Ferryman. The character is voiced by singer Dick Rivers in the French version.
 Chazz Palminteri as the Travel Agent
 Rob Corddry and Nate Corddry (The Weinstein Company version) as Seldes
 Erik Per Sullivan (The Weinsten Company version) as the baby bug
 David Suchet (The Weinstein Company version) as the narrator

Production 
The animation was produced by the French company BUF Compagnie, which hired approximately 100 animators, most of them from French animation schools and without any previous experience. Besson wanted a photorealistic environment, and BUF initially used microlenses to film physical environments, but eventually instead used photogrammetry, where a digitized photograph of a real object is manipulated with a computer. Sets were built to 1:3 scale, which allowed the animators to use natural elements, such as plants and grass. While the film did not use motion capture, real actors were used as reference, and recorded with 13 to 14 video cameras, but without the markers used in motion capture. Besson directed their performances. In terms of lip sync with actors' dialog, the French animators could not cope with the English phonemes. For Madonna and David Bowie, a camera was used to record their lips to help the animators. The animation was done with proprietary software.

Soundtrack

Reception

Box office 
The film was budgeted at $86 million. In its first two weeks in cinemas in France Arthur earned over US$20 million.

Critical response 
Arthur and the Invisibles received negative reviews from film critics. In the United States, the film has an approval rating of 22% via Rotten Tomatoes, based on reviews from 92 critics, with an average rating of 4.4/10. The site's census reads: "Arthur wastes its big-name voice talent on a predictable script and substandard CG animation". On Metacritic, the film has a score of 39 out of 100, based on reviews from 22 critics.

Los Angeles Times reviewer Alex Chun wrote: "Director Luc Besson admits he knew nothing about animation before he started this project, and it shows". Variety'''s Robert Koehler called it "alienating and dislikable", and specifically noted that "…having African-American thesps Snoop Dogg and Anthony Anderson voice creatures that are basically humanoid monkeys shows poor taste".

Many found it derivative of sources ranging from King Arthur and the Sword-in-the-Stone to The Dark Crystal and The Ant Bully films. Frank Lovece of Film Journal International said that "it all simply looks as if [conceptual artist Patrice] Garcia and Besson couldn't decide on any one thing to copy, …so they copied them all". Lovece also noted that "the whole thing gets seriously creepy when [the animated versions of] the grown-up, pinup-beauty princess and the 10-year-old boy fall for each other. Mary Kay Letourneau comes uncomfortably to mind". Common Sense Media disliked the film, giving it 2 stars out of 5. Josh Tyler of Cinema Blend greatly disliked the film, giving it 1.5 stars out of 5: "Sure it has sometimes-loved French director Luc Besson's name on it, but the character designs look like they were stolen from those wispy haired troll dolls that were popular for about five minutes fifteen years ago, and the plot sounded like it was written by a ten-year-old kid underneath a heavy bedspread, with a big chief tablet and a pencil the size of a horse's leg". Besson, in a May 2007 interview, blamed American distributor The Weinstein Company for the film's failure in the U.S., saying "…why the critics didn't like Arthur was because [Weinstein] changed so much of the film and tried to pretend the film was American. […] America and the UK were the only countries where the films were changed. The rest of the world has the same film as France".

 Awards 
In 2007, the film received two awards: on 1 February for Imagina Award in the category Prix du Long-Métrage and on 1 October, Mylène Farmer was awarded the NRJ Ciné Award for her dubbing of Sélénia's voice in Arthur and the Minimoys.

 Differences between release versions 

After a screening test in the United States, The Weinstein Company re-edited the film. Approximately nine minutes were cut. Most of the edits pertained to the love story between Arthur and Selenia (due to age differences). The scenes were:
 Arthur's arrival at the Minimoy world in the middle of a Ceremony centering on Selenia's coming of age;
 Arthur falling in love with Selenia at first sight;
 Arthur removing a string from Selenia's corset to use as a climbing-rope, and Selenia taking the string back;
 Max referring to their drinks as 'Jack Fire' instead of Genie Soda. Also, when Arthur escapes the bar during the blackout, Max smokes something that resembles a blunt.
 Selenia kissing Arthur before confronting Maltazard, and Betameche congratulating them;
 Selenia kissing Arthur before he returns to his own world;
 Arthur learning of the custom that a princess must wait ten lunar months before kissing her chosen husband for the second time;
 Davido attempting to steal the treasure from Archibald, before being captured by the Bogo Matassalai;
 Arthur's grandmother in the antique dealership prior to them arriving at her home;
 Max telling Selenia about his 7 wives while they are dancing;
 Malthazar confronting Selenia about her engagement to Arthur.
 Selenia teasing Arthur while crawling into the toy car, causing Arthur to gasp at the distracting display.

In addition to these deleted scenes, The Weinstein Company's version also adds in new narration by David Suchet replacing Ron Crawford's narration as Archibald, along with actors Jimmy Fallon, Emilio Estevez, Harvey Keitel, Rob Corddry, Nate Corddry, Erik Per Sullivan, Anthony Anderson and Jason Bateman replacing various actors from the original version. The entire storyline involving the parents and their greed for money was also deleted, reduced to a short scene and the narrator explaining that worrying over their son was all they needed to reform completely.

The British version of the film, also distributed by the Weinstein Company, similarly lacked these scenes.

 Technology 
The Minimoys featured in the first augmented reality Nestlé Chocopic cereal box with the help of Dassault Systemes technology 3DVIA Virtools.

 Franchise 
 Sequels Arthur and the Minimoys was followed by a 2009 sequel, Arthur and the Revenge of Maltazard, based on the novel of the same name, and another sequel in 2010 titled Arthur 3: The War of the Two Worlds, based on the final book in the series. In the UK and Ireland, both sequels were combined into a single movie, Arthur and the Great Adventure, released in December 2010.

 Television series 
An animated TV series, Arthur and the Minimoys, was produced by Studio 100, and debuted in 17 July 2018. A 20-episode web series was also being planned.

 Spin-off 
A horror-themed spin-off, titled Arthur, malédiction'', was produced. Written by Besson and directed by Barthélemy Grossmann, the film is not set in the same universe and follows a group of teenagers who are looking for the house where the original trilogy was filmed only to find that it is in reality haunted. It was released theatrically in France on 29 June 2022. The film was poorly received by critics and fans of the franchise and is considered to be one of the worst films ever made.

References

External links 

 
 
 
 Arthur and the Minimoys at Keyframe
 Arthur and the Minimoys at CanMag

2006 films
2000s fantasy adventure films
2000s fantasy comedy films
2000s children's adventure films
2000s children's fantasy films
2006 computer-animated films
Films based on children's books
Films directed by Luc Besson
Films set in 1960
Films set in Connecticut
Films based on multiple works of a series
Films with live action and animation
High fantasy films
EuropaCorp films
Films produced by Luc Besson
Films about shapeshifting
Films about size change
Films scored by Éric Serra
French animated fantasy films
French fantasy adventure films
English-language French films
French fantasy comedy films
2006 comedy films
2000s English-language films
2000s French films
The Weinstein Company animated films
Alternative versions of films